Al-Ard ("The Land") was a  Palestinian political movement made up of Arab citizens of Israel active between 1958 and some time in the 1970s which attracted international attention. Following unsuccessful efforts to secure registration of the organization as an Israeli NGO and secure it a publishing permit, it was outlawed in 1964. The political movement's goal was, according to political historian David McDowall, "to achieve complete equality and social justice for all classes of people in Israel" and "to find a just solution for the Palestine problem as a whole, and as an indivisible unit." Al-Ard's disappearance as a movement was linked both to governmental and popular resistance, with the Israeli Community Party denouncing the group and Palestinian Arab communities inside of Israel concerned that Al-Ard might destroy them.

See also
 Abnaa al-Balad
 Land Day

References

Bibliography

Jiryis, Sabri (1976): The Arabs in Israel, 1st American edition  (updated from the 1966 ed.) With a foreword by Noam Chomsky. 
Lustick, Ian (1980): Arabs in the Jewish State : Israel's control of a national minority. Austin : University of Texas Press, (al-Ard: p.128, 249)

  

Political organizations based in Israel
Arab citizens of Israel